The 2004–05 season was the 103rd in the history of the Western Football League.

The league champions for the eighth time in their history, and the third time in four seasons, were Bideford. The champions of Division One were Willand Rovers.

Final tables

Premier Division
The Premier Division was increased from 18 to 20 clubs after Paulton Rovers were promoted to the Southern League, and Dawlish Town and Elmore were relegated to the First Division. Five clubs joined:

Bitton, runners-up in the First Division.
Bristol Manor Farm, third in the First Division.
Clyst Rovers, fourth in the First Division.
Corsham Town, fifth in the First Division.
Hallen, champions of the First Division.

First Division
The First Division was increased from 19 to 20 clubs after Hallen, Bitton, Bristol Manor Farm, Clyst Rovers and Corsham Town were promoted to the Premier Division and six clubs joined:

Almondsbury, promoted from the Gloucestershire County League.
Biddestone, promoted from the Wiltshire League.
Dawlish Town, relegated from the Premier Division.
Elmore, relegated from the Premier Division.
Radstock Town, promoted from the Somerset County League.
Saltash United, promoted from the South Western League.

References

2004-05
9